The Girls doubles tournament of the 2012 BWF World Junior Championships was held from October 30 until November 3. Lee So-hee and Shin Seung-chan from South Korea were the defending champion. This year, they defend their title after beating Chinese pair Huang Yaqiong and Yu Xiaohan 21-14, 18-21, 21-18 in the final.

Seeded

  Gabriela Stoeva / Stefani Stoeva (quarter-final)
  Lee So-hee / Shin Seung-chan (champion)
  Shella Devi Aulia / Anggia Shitta Awanda (second round)
  Chow Mei Kuan / Lee Meng Yean (semi-final)
  Chen Qingchen / Huang Dongping (quarter-final)
  Chen Szu-yu / Chen Ting-yi (third round)
  Melati Daeva Oktavianti / Rosyita Eka Putri Sari (quarter-final)
  Yu Xiaohan / Huang Yaqiong (final)

Draw

Finals

Top Half

Section 1

Section 2

Section 3

Section 4

Bottom Half

Section 5

Section 6

Section 7

Section 8

References
Main Draw (Archived 2013-07-13)

2012 BWF World Junior Championships
2012 in youth sport